The 1976–77 National Hurling League was the 46th season of the National Hurling League.

Division 1

Kilkenny came into the season as defending champions of the 1975-76 season. Wicklow entered Division 1 as the promoted team.

On 24 April 1977, Clare won the title after a 2-8 to 0-9 win over Kilkenny in the final. It was their second league title overall and their first since 1945-46.

Wicklow were relegated from Division 1 after just one season in the top flight.

Cork's Pat Moylan and Clare's Colm Honan were the Division 1 joint-top scorers.

Division 1A

Group stage

Division 1B

Group stage

Play-off

Knock-out stage

Quarter-finals

Semi-finals

Final

Scoring statistics

Top scorers overall

Top scorers in a single game

Division 2

On 20 February 1977, Westmeath won the title after a 5-14 to 0-7 win over Meath in the final round of the group stage.

Division 2 table

References

National Hurling League seasons
League
League